Aequorivita nionensis is a Gram-negative, rod-shaped and non-motile bacterium from the genus of Aequorivita which has been isolated from water from a hydrothermal vent from Espalamaca in the Azores.

References 

Flavobacteria
Bacteria described in 2015